The KBS Tuff (Kay Behrensmeyer Site Tuff) is an ash layer in East African Rift Valley sediments, derived from a volcanic eruption that occurred approximately 1.87 million years ago (Ma). The tuff is widely distributed geographically, and marks a significant transition between water flow and associated environmental conditions around Lake Turkana shortly after 2 Ma.

Between 1970-1985 the age of the tuff was the subject of intense academic dispute, with a variety of dates proposed by different geochemical and paleontological laboratories. This dispute came to be known as the KBS Tuff Controversy.

The KBS Tuff has been described as "the Turkana Basin’s most celebrated tephrostratigraphic marker."

Geography

The KBS Tuff was first reported and described by Kay Behrensmeyer (hence "KBS", Kay Behrensmeyer Site) in sediments that belong to Omo Group deposits in southern Ethiopia and northern Kenya. Within this larger group, the KBS has been found in the Shungura Formation in southern Ethiopia, In the Nachukui Formation on the west side of Lake Turkana in northern Kenya, and in the Koobi Fora Formation on the east side of Lake Turkana.

Age and chronological sequence

Argon-argon dating has placed the age of the KBS Tuff at 1.869 ± 0.021 Ma. This age estimate is supported by independent fission track and K/Ar dating methods. KBS is situated above the older Kangaki (2.063 Ma), G-3 (2.188 Ma) and Kalochoro (2.331 Ma) tuffs, and below the younger Malbe (1.843 Ma), Morutot (1.607 Ma) and Lower Ileret (1.527 Ma) tuffs. In some locations tuffs with chemical compositions identical to the KBS tuff have been found in multiple, distinct layers, suggesting that deposition of the layers occurred at various times after eruption.

Within Omo group deposits, the KBS tuff separates distinct sedimentary members of the Nachukui and Foobi Fora formations. In the Nachukui (western) formation, KBS divides the older Kalochoro from the younger Kaitio member. In the Koobi Fora formation, it separates the older Burgi from the younger KBS member.

Environmental context

The KBS Tuff marks a transition in the Turkana Basin from a stable to a fluctuating lake, partly filled by a river and delta system to the north and east of the basin.

Associated hominin remains

In Koobi Fora, on the eastern side of Lake Turkana, a substantial number of hominin fossils have been found immediately below or above the KBS Tuff. A partial list is provided below, including a few specimens from north and west Lake Turkana.

Cranial remains below KBS

KNM-ER 1470
KNM-ER 1474
KNM-ER 3735
KNM-ER 2598
KNM-ER 5879
KNM-ER 1813
KNM-ER 1800
KNM-ER 3732
KNM-ER 1501
KNM-ER 3729
KNM-ER 1502
KNM-ER 1812
KNM-ER 1801
KNM-ER 1802
KNM-ER 3731
KNM-ER 3734
KNM-ER 1482
KNM-ER 1469
KNM-ER 1803
KNM-ER 1483
KNM-ER 150
L.894-1

Cranial remains at or above KBS

KNM-ER 1590
KNM-ER 1593
KNM-ER 1805
KNM-ER 407
KNM-ER 814
KNM-ER 1804
KNM-ER 164
KNM-ER 3733
KNM-ER 1808
KNM-ER 1821
KNM-ER 734
KNM-ER 807
KNM-ER 406
KNM-ER 732
KNM-ER 730
KNM-ER 1170
KNM-WT 1740

KBS Tuff controversy

The KBS Tuff was first dated in 1969, after Behrensmeyer discovered stone tools at Koobi Fora in the layer of the Tuff. Argon/Argon dating was performed by Frank Fitch at Birckbeck College in London and Jack Miller at the University of Cambridge in Cambridge, UK, who found a most likely age of 2.61 Ma for the KBS eruption. This find had important implications for the anthropological community because it provided a very old age for the tools found by Behresmeyer, and for associated crania including KNM-ER 1470, attributed to the genus Homo.

The date was called into question because efforts to replicate the findings produced KBS Tuff ages ranging from less than 1 to over 220 Ma. A study of pig molar anatomy from the site, by Vincent Maglio and Basil Cooke, suggested an age closer to 2 Ma or even less, using methods of biogeochronology. Similar investigation using antelope remains by Alan Gentry at the British Museum of Natural History also contradicted the Argon-Argon 2.6 Ma Tuff. Another problem that emerged was that the 2.6 Ma date for the KBS Tuff, provided by Fitch and Miller, made alignment of the Koobi Fora (east Turkana) geochronology with the Omo (north Turkana) geochronology impossible.

The conflict was resolved after geochemist Garniss Curtis and his student Thure E. Cerling conducted independent investigations of the age of the KBS Tuff using Argon-Argon and Potassium-Argon dating at the Berkeley Geochronology Laboratory. Curtis and Cerling found that the material dated by the Cambridge team actually belonged to two separate tuffs, which they estimated at 1.8 and 1.6 Ma. This date was confirmed by Potassium-Argon dating conducted by Ian McDougall, and later Fission-Track dating conducted by Andy Gleadow.

See also

Meave Leakey
Richard Leakey
Francis Harold Brown
Thure E. Cerling

References

Pleistocene paleontological sites of Africa
Prehistoric Kenya
Lake Turkana
Paleoanthropological sites
Geology of Kenya
Paleontology in Kenya
Geology controversies